Dominic Savage (born 23 November 1962) is a British BAFTA award-winning director, writer, and actor.

Originally a child actor — making several television appearances and featuring in Stanley Kubrick's Barry Lyndon (1975) — Savage moved into writing and directing in his mid-thirties, going on to win BAFTAs for Nice Girl (2000) and When I Was 12 (2001). He is also well known for his 2009 film, a BBC2 TV drama entitled Freefall.

Filmography

as director
Nice Girl (TV film) (2000)
When I Was 12 (TV film) (2001)
Out of Control (TV film) (2002)
Love + Hate (2005)
Born Equal (TV film) (2006)
Freefall (TV film) (2009)
Dive (TV film) (2010)
True Love (TV series) (2012)
The Secrets (TV series) (2014)
The Escape (2017)
I Am... (2019-2022)

as actor
Barry Lyndon (1975) - Young Bullingdon
 The Devil's Crown (1978) - Young Henry
The Mystery of the Disappearing Schoolgirls (1980) - Quartus

References

External links

1962 births
Living people
BAFTA winners (people)
British film directors